Giovanni de' Gigli was a fifteenth-century canon of Wells and Bishop of Worcester.   He was nominated to the bishopric on 30 August 1497 and consecrated on 10 September 1497. However, before he could return to England to serve as bishop, he died in Rome on 25 August 1498.

Citations

References

 

Bishops of Worcester
1498 deaths
15th-century Italian Roman Catholic bishops
Year of birth unknown